Nicephora is a genus of Asian bush crickets belonging to the tribe Meconematini in the subfamily Meconematinae. They are found in India, Sri Lanka, southern China, and Vietnam.

Species 
The Orthoptera Species File lists the following species, 
Subgenus Dianicephora
Auth. Gorochov, 1993 - Indian subcontinent
 Nicephora mirabilis Bolívar, 1900
Subgenus Eunicephora
Auth. Gorochov, 1998
 Nicephora dianxiensis Wang & Liu, 2013 - southern China
 Nicephora ulla Gorochov, 1998 - Vietnam
Subgenus Nicephora
Auth. Bolívar, 1900 - Indian subcontinent
 Nicephora forficulata Carl, 1921
 Nicephora hakgallae Henry, 1932
 Nicephora mazerani Bolívar, 1900
 Nicephora subulata Bolívar, 1900
 Nicephora trigonidioides Bolívar, 1900 – type species

References

External links

Tettigoniidae genera
Meconematinae
Orthoptera of Asia